Kanadan Sanomat is a Canadian weekly Finnish language newspaper established in 2012 in Toronto, Ontario, Canada, as a merger between two earlier publications both owned by Vapaa Sana Press Ltd. It is also promoting the logo KS as a shortened name particularly for online promotion.

Kanadan Sanomat is a merger of two newspapers:
Vapaa Sana published between 1931 and 2012 in Toronto, Ontario
Canadan Sanomat published between 2001 and 2012 in Thunder Bay, Ontario, Canada

Kanadan Sanomat is considered a natural continuation of both papers and serves both Toronto and Thunder Bay readers that were earlier served by the two newspapers.

The new newspaper utilizes the K in the name Kanadan Sanomat referring to Canada with a K as customary in the Finnish language, rather than its predecessor Canadan Sanomat.

External links
 http://www.finnishcanadian.com

References

European-Canadian culture in Ontario
Finnish Canadian
Newspapers published in Toronto
Weekly newspapers published in Ontario
Multicultural and ethnic newspapers published in Canada
Newspapers established in 2012
2012 establishments in Ontario